Charles George Alexander Doig (27 April 1883 – 31 October 1944) was an Australian rules football player and coach. A member of the Doig sporting family, Doig played 209 games for the East Fremantle Football Club in the West Australian Football League (WAFL) between 1903 and 1921, including seven premierships. Playing mainly as a forward, Doig led the WAFL's goalkicking on two occasions, in 1908 and 1909. His two sons, Charles Jr. and George Doig, also played football for East Fremantle.

Career
Born to James Alexander Doig and Agnes Robertson in Royal Park, South Australia, Doig was the fourth-born of seven brothers, two of which died as children. His parents had emigrated from Dundee, Scotland in 1878 aboard the steamer Largo Bay.

Family
Doig married Isabella Brand Miller, originally of Dundee, Scotland, at Scots Church, Fremantle, on 27 October 1909. The Western Mail described it as "a remarkably pretty wedding". The couple had three children: Linda May (born 1910), Charles George (born 1912), and George Ronald (born 1913). Both Charles Jr. and George went on to captain East Fremantle.

References

1883 births
1944 deaths
Australian military personnel of World War I
Australian people of Scottish descent
Charles
East Fremantle Football Club players
Sportsmen from Western Australia
Australian rules footballers from Adelaide
East Fremantle Football Club administrators
Australian rules footballers from Perth, Western Australia
West Australian Football Hall of Fame inductees
Military personnel from Western Australia